Maria Thomas van 't Hek (born 1 April 1958) is a Dutch former field hockey striker who played 221 international matches for the Dutch national field hockey team, in which he scored a total number of 106 goals. He made his debut on 24 September 1976 against East Germany, and competed for the Netherlands at the 1984 Summer Olympics in Los Angeles, California.

After his hockey career he became the head coach of the Dutch women's hockey team, with whom he won two bronze Olympic medals, at the 1996 Summer Olympics and at the 2000 Summer Olympics. Furthermore,  the Netherlands won the European title twice (1995 and 1999) with van 't Hek in charge. He resigned after the Sydney Games and became a radio presenter of a popular sports program called Langs de Lijn.

Van 't Hek is the younger brother of Dutch comedian and publicist Youp van 't Hek.

External links
 
KNHB Profile  

1958 births
Living people
Dutch male field hockey players
Olympic field hockey players of the Netherlands
Dutch field hockey coaches
National team coaches
Field hockey players at the 1984 Summer Olympics
People from Naarden
SV Kampong players
1990 Men's Hockey World Cup players
Dutch radio presenters
Sportspeople from North Holland
20th-century Dutch people
21st-century Dutch people